Seronga is a village in North-West District, Botswana. It is located close to beginning of the Okavango Delta, and has a local airstrip. The population of Seronga was 1,641 in 2001 census. In 2011 population census, the village had a population of 3716 making it the fourth largest village in Ngamiland West (Nokaneng to Gudikwa). Seronga village has two government schools namely; Seronga Primary School and Ngambao Junior Secondary School. In addition, Seronga village has other government facilities namely Seronga Sub-Land Board, Seronga Police Station, Seronga Airfield, National Parks and Wildlife Office, Tribal Administration office headed by Senior Chief Representative, 24 hour Clinic with a Doctor.

http://www.statsbots.org.bw/sites/default/files/publications/national_statisticsreport.pdf==References==

North-West District (Botswana)
Villages in Botswana